ATP-dependent RNA helicase DDX3Y is an enzyme that in humans is encoded by the DDX3Y gene.

DEAD box proteins, characterized by the conserved motif Asp-Glu-Ala-Asp (DEAD), are putative RNA helicases. They are implicated in a number of cellular processes involving alteration of RNA secondary structure such as translation initiation, nuclear and mitochondrial splicing, and ribosome and spliceosome assembly. Based on their distribution patterns, some members of this family are believed to be involved in embryogenesis, spermatogenesis, and cellular growth and division. This gene encodes a DEAD box protein, and it has a homolog on the X chromosome (DDX3X). The gene mutation causes male infertility, Sertoli cell-only syndrome or severe hypospermatogenesis, suggesting that this gene plays a key role in the spermatogenic process. Alternative splicing of this gene generates 2 transcripts, which differ only in the length of the 3' UTR.

References

Further reading